Jo Bannister (born 31 July 1951 in Rochdale, Lancashire) is a British crime fiction novelist.

Life and work
She began her career as a journalist and rose to become editor of the County Down Spectator  before resigning to devote all her time to her writing. She has had over 30 novels published both in English and translated into several other languages. 
Most of these belong to five series, while nine are standalone novels. Her books are well reviewed, with the New York Times, for example, referring to her "solid series of British police procedurals", and praising the Castlemere novels for their "superb character work" in the context of a "deeply satisfying series".

Clio Rees and Harry Marsh novels
 Striving with Gods ( An Uncertain Death) (1984)
 Gilgamesh (1989)
 The Going Down of the Sun (1989)
 The Fifth Cataract (2005)

Mickey Flynn novels
 Shards (a.k.a. Critical Angle) (1990)
 Death and Other Lovers (1991)

Castlemere novels
 A Bleeding of Innocents (1993)
 Charisma (a.k.a. Sins of the Heart) (1994)
 A Taste for Burning (a.k.a. Burning Desires) (1995)
 No Birds Sing (1996)
 Broken Lines (1998)
 The Hireling's Tale (1999)
 Changelings (2000)

Rosie Holland novels
 The Primrose Convention (1997)
 The Primrose Switchback (2000)

Brodie Farrell novels
 Echoes of Lies (2001)
 True Witness (2002)
 Reflections (2003)
 The Depths of Solitude (2004)
 Breaking Faith (2005)
 Requiem for a Dealer (2006)
 Flawed (2007)
 Closer Still (2008)
 Liars All (2009)

Hazel Best & Gabriel Ash novels
 Deadly Virtues (2013)
 Perfect Sins (2014)
 Desperate Measures (2015)
 Other Countries (2017)
 Kindred Spirits (2018)

Standalone novels
 The Matrix (1981)
 The Winter Plain (1982)
 A Cactus Garden (1983)
 Mosaic (1986)
 The Mason Codex (a.k.a. Unlawful Entry) (1988)
 The Lazarus Hotel (1996)
 Tinderbox (2006)
 From Fire and Flood (2007)
 Fathers and Sins (2008)
 Death in High Places (2011)

References

1951 births
Living people
British crime writers
British journalists
People from Rochdale
Women mystery writers